The 2008 AFC Challenge Cup football tournament was organised by AFC and was hosted by India.The tournament was played from 30 July – 13 August 2008. India won the final against Tajikistan. India was also the winner of the fair play award and the India captain Bhaichung Bhutia won the most valuable player award.

Chinese Taipei was originally designated the host, but could not guarantee it would meet the AFC's standards for hosting the tournament. Thailand was first chosen as host but withdrew due to lack of time to prepare. The Philippines also was to take over as host with matches to be played in Bacolod in May 2008 but the plan failed to materialized.

The winners of the 2008 and 2010 competitions will qualify directly for the 2011 Asian Cup. As a result, India qualified for the AFC Asian Cup, the first time since 1984.This competition is exclusive to members of the emerging nations class of the AFC. However, in the previous edition, Bangladesh and India were invited from the developing nations class – Bangladesh actually hosting the tournament, and India sending their under-20 team. India and Bangladesh have again been invited for the 2008 edition of the tournament, along with North Korea, Myanmar and Turkmenistan who are also a part of the developing nations class.

Laos withdrew from the competition on 2 May 2008.
Palestine withdrew from the competition on 14 May 2008.

Due to the poor conditions of the pitch at Lal Bahadur Shastri Stadium, the AFC moved the majority of the matches to another venue. It was decided that ten matches would be played at the Gachibowli Athletic Stadium, and two at the LBS Stadium. Due to incessant rains in Hyderabad in the days leading up to the final, the AFC changed the venue of the final and the third place play-off to the Ambedkar Stadium in New Delhi.

Tournament 
Qualification saw the top team from each of the four qualification groups qualify for the tournament proper, bringing the total number of participating teams in the centralized finals to eight. In addition, India (tournament hosts), Korea DPR, Turkmenistan and Myanmar qualified automatically.

Mongolia and Timor-Leste decided not to take part.

Seeding 
Bold Type – qualified teams, Italics – withdrawn teams

 
 
 
 
 
 
 
 
  (Withdrew 14 May 2008)
 
 
 
 
 
 
 
 
 
 
  (Withdrew 2 May 2008)

Venues

Qualification 

The following teams qualified for the final tournament:
  (Host)
  (Automatic Qualifier)
  (Automatic Qualifier)
  (Automatic Qualifier)
  (Winner Qualification Group A)
  (Winner Qualification Group B)
  (Winner Qualification Group C)
  (Winner Qualification Group D)

Squads

Group stage 
All times are Indian Standard Time (IST) – UTC+5:30

Tie-breaking criteria 
Where two or more teams end the group stage with the same number of points, their ranking is determined by the following criteria:
 points earned in the matches between the teams concerned;
 goal difference in the matches between the teams concerned;
 number of goals scored in the group matches between the teams concerned;
 goal difference in all group matches;
 number of goals scored in all group matches;
 kicks from the penalty mark (if only two teams are level and they are both on the field of play);
 fewer yellow and red cards received in the group matches;
 drawing of lots by the organising committee.

Group A

Group B

Knockout stage

Semi-finals

Third place play-off

Final

Winner

Awards

Goalscorers 

6 goals
  Pak Song-chol

4 goals
  Sunil Chhetri
  Yusuf Rabiev
  Guwançmuhammet Öwekow

3 goals
  Bhaichung Bhutia

2 goals
  Soe Myat Min
  Ro Hak-su

1 goal
  Climax Lawrence
  Myo Min Tun
  Si Thu Win
  Yan Paing
  Yazar Win Thein

1 goal
  K.C. Anjan
  Ju Manu Rai
  Santosh Sahukhala
  Kasun Jayasuriya
  Fatkhullo Fatkhuloev
  Dzhomikhon Mukhidinov
  Davronjon Tukhtasunov
  Vyacheslav Krendelev
  Ýusup Orazmämmedow
 
Own goal
  Madushka Peiris (playing against Korea DPR)
  Alisher Tuychiev (playing against India)

Team statistics
This table shows all team performance. Matches that ended in a penalty shoot out are counted as draws

References

External links 
 Official Site
 Stats at a glance

 
2008
2008 in Asian football
2008
2
2008 in Tajikistani football
2008 in Turkmenistani football
2008 in Afghan football
2008 in North Korean football
2008–09 in Sri Lankan football
2008 in Burmese football
2008 in Nepalese sport